Michael Allen Muir (born March 14, 1963) is an American singer who is the lead vocalist and the only sole continuous member of Los Angeles-based bands Suicidal Tendencies, Los Cycos, and Infectious Grooves. He has also released several solo albums under his nickname Cyco Miko. Muir's trademark is wearing bandanas, jerseys with the number 13, and hats with block-style letters that read "suicidal".

Early life
Born in Venice, Los Angeles, and raised in Santa Monica, Mike Muir is the younger brother of Jim Muir of the Dogtown skateboarding team. Jim exposed Mike to metal music as well as skateboarding. Muir attended Santa Monica College after being kicked out of school in the 10th grade.

Career
Muir has cited bands such as the Sex Pistols, the Ramones, Black Sabbath, UFO, AC/DC, Van Halen, Emerson, Lake & Palmer, Led Zeppelin, and Kiss as his early musical influences, and has said that he was introduced to funk music by former bandmate Robert Trujillo. Muir incorporated funk influences into a few songs by Suicidal Tendencies and into his funk metal side project, Infectious Grooves.

Suicidal Tendencies

Muir formed Suicidal Tendencies in 1980 when he was 17 years old. It originally consisted of Muir on vocals, Mike Ball on guitar, Carlos "Egie" Egert on drums, and Mike Dunnigan on bass. There were several lineup changes before Muir hired Grant Estes, Louiche Mayorga and Amery Smith on guitar, bass and drums respectively. In 1983, they released their self-titled album, with success sparked by the anthem song "Institutionalized", which would become one of the first hardcore punk videos to receive substantial airplay on MTV. They have since played tours and festivals worldwide. When No Mercy guitarist Mike Clark was hired as the band's second guitarist in 1987, Suicidal Tendencies began making a change from punk to metal, thus creating what would become crossover thrash, and later began adding funk influences to their music. Robert Trujillo, who was the bassist for Suicidal Tendencies from 1989 to 1995, was responsible for turning Muir on to funk music, and the pair would eventually form Infectious Grooves to play more funk oriented music.

Cited as one of the most important crossover thrash groups, Suicidal Tendencies was active until 1995, but reunited a year later. Suicidal Tendencies has been touring or playing selected shows almost every year, and until the 2013 release of their ninth studio album 13, they had not released an album containing new music in over a decade. Between the releases of Free Your Soul and Save My Mind and 13, however, the band had debuted new material on stage and through compilation releases on a regular basis.

Los Cycos
Muir formed Los Cycos in 1984 during Suicidal's first year of their four-year recording hiatus. Current guitarist Jon Nelson left the group and Suicidal Tendencies were banned from playing L.A. shows, largely due to an incident at Perkins Palace where their audience tore out the first 10 rows, making it impossible for promoters to obtain insurance if Suicidal was on the bill. Muir started the label Suicidal Records with bassist Louiche Mayorga. Los Cycos originally consisted of Mike Muir (vocals), Bob Heathcote (bass), Anthony "Bob" Gallo (guitars) and Amery Smith (drums). After a few rehearsals, Amery Smith left the line up, along with bandmate Jon Nelson to start their own band (the Brood). Los Cycos eventually included: Grant Estes on lead guitar, Gallo went to (rhythm), and original choices Bob Heathcote and Amery Smith were replaced by Louiche Mayorga (bass) and No Mercy's Sal Troy (drums). Rehearsals continued in preparation for their debut recording for "Welcome to Venice" on Suicidal Records. With the final line-up established and two songs "It's Not Easy" and "A Little Each Day", Los Cycos was born. "Welcome to Venice" was the first record to be released on Suicidal Records, and the album also included local Venice, Los Angeles bands Suicidal Tendencies, Beowülf, No Mercy, and Excel. Unfortunately the original masters were lost in a fire and no effort has been made to release the material digitally. Mike Muir's vocals can be heard on the Suicidal Tendencies cut "Look Up...(The Boys are Back) and the Los Cycos track "It's Not Easy". Grant Estes played all guitars on the recordings.

Other music projects

Muir has released solo albums under his nickname Cyco Miko and has sung for No Mercy, replacing original singer Kevin Guercio, who sang for the band on the Welcome to Venice compilation. Cyco Miko released three albums on the record label Suicidal Records. The album Schizophrenic Born Again Problem Child was released in 2001, following up 1996's Lost My Brain! (Once Again). In October 2011 a third Cyco Miko album was released worldwide, featuring previously unreleased and newly written music from Cyco Miko, Suicidal Tendencies and Infectious Grooves. The album entitled "The Mad Mad Muir Musical Tour - Part 1" featured current Suicidal Tendencies band members as well as performances by Fletcher Dragge, Robert Trujillo, Brooks Wackerman, bassist Thundercat (Stephen Bruner) and saxophonist Kamasi Washington. No Mercy released only one album with Muir, Widespread Bloodshed/Love Runs Red on Suicidal Records.

In 1989, not long after Robert Trujillo joined Suicidal Tendencies, Muir and Trujillo formed Infectious Grooves, a funk metal band that often brought out a goofier type of humor: their albums contain comedy skits by a reptilian lover named Aladdin Sarsippius Sulemenagic Jackson III. To date, the Infectious Grooves have released four albums.

Muir executive produced Excel's 1987 debut album Split Image.

Muir provided vocals on the P.O.D. song "Kaliforn-Eye-A" from their 2008 album When Angels & Serpents Dance.

In May 2021, Muir along with Tim Armstrong (Rancid), Matt Freeman (Rancid), Fletcher Dragge (Pennywise), and Byron McMacken (Pennywise) formed a punk rock supergroup called The Crew. The band's first single, "One Voice", was released on Epitaph Records.

Personal life
In 2003 Muir had his first of two back surgeries for a ruptured, herniated disc. The other, in 2005, caused him to cancel Brazilian festival dates and Suicidal shows. Muir is married and has three children. In early 2011 he returned to the United States after living in Queensland, Australia for a short period of time.

His house was made over into a "horror house" on the Discovery Channel show Monster House.

On March 7, 1996, Muir fought Simon Woodstock in a celebrity boxing match on the Action Sports channel. Muir lost to Woodstock.

Muir was a longtime friend to Texan film actor Bill Paxton. The two worked with each other for the LA Times in the late 1970s before Muir formed Suicidal Tendencies and Paxton started his career in Hollywood. Following Paxton's death in 2017, Muir expressed in a tribute his heartfelt condolences to the late actor on Suicidal Tendencies' Facebook page.

Views

Muir is known for being outspoken on his views about the music industry and society. He has long been an opponent of the Parents Music Resource Center (PMRC), and has reflected this in interviews and a few songs (namely "You Can't Bring Me Down" and "Lovely"). Muir was involved in a near-violent feud with Megadeth frontman Dave Mustaine during the European Clash of the Titans tour, but the two have since reconciled and are apparently now on friendly terms.

Muir has criticized the band Rage Against the Machine, who are well known for expressing anti-corporate, left-wing politics in their lyrics, but are signed with Epic Records, a subsidiary of Sony, a Japanese multinational conglomerate corporation. The Infectious Grooves song "Do What I Tell Ya!", from their album Groove Family Cyco, mocks the band for this contradiction. Muir later stated that Rage Against the Machine's guitarist, Tom Morello, provoked the feud by attacking Suicidal Tendencies.

Muir has stated he has never used drugs and doesn't drink alcohol.

Selected discography

References

External links

1963 births
American male singers
American heavy metal singers
Living people
American punk rock singers
Musicians from Los Angeles
Suicidal Tendencies members